"Tarantula" is a song by British group Faithless. It was released in December 2001 as the third single from their third studio album Outrospective.  The song reached number 29 in UK Singles Chart.

Track listing

UK CD1
 Tarantula (Radio Edit) [Radio Mix] - 03:05
 Tarantula (Rollo & Sister Bliss Funky As F*** Mix) - 08:28
 Tarantula (Tiësto Remix) [Edit] - 08:20

UK CD2
 Tarantula (Radio Edit) [Radio Mix] - 03:05
 Tarantula (Rollo & Sister Bliss Big Mix) - 07:20
 Tarantula (Hiver & Hammer Remix) - 07:03

Australian CD1
 Crazy English Summer (DJ Aloé Remix) - 03:52
 Tarantula (Radio Edit) - 03:05
 Tarantula (Rollo & Sister Bliss Funky Mix) - 08:27
 Tarantula (Subtech Remix) - 09:05
 Muhammad Ali (Oliver Lieb Remix) - 07:10

Australian CD2
 Crazy English Summer (Aloé Radio Edit) - 03:52
 Tarantula (Radio Edit) - 03:05
 Tarantula (Tiësto Remix) - 09:19
 Tarantula (Hiver & Hammer Remix) - 07:02
 Crazy English Summer (Aloé Extended Remix) - 06:03

German CD1
 Tarantula (Radio Edit) - 03:19
 Tarantula (Rollo & Sister Bliss Funky As F*** Mix) - 08:29
 Tarantula (Tiësto Remix) - 09:21
 Tarantula (Subtech Mix) - 09:06

German CD2
 Tarantula (Radio Edit) - 03:19
 Tarantula (Rollo & Sister Bliss Big Mix) - 07:19
 Tarantula (Hiver & Hammer Remix) - 07:03
 Crazy English Summer (DJ Aloé Remix) - 03:50

Danish Release
 Crazy English Summer (Album Version) - 02:44
 Crazy English Summer (DJ Aloé Remix) - 03:52
 Crazy English Summer (Extended Remix) [DJ Aloé] - 06:03
 Tarantula (Radio Edit) - 03:18

Chart positions

References

FaithlessWeb.com
Faithless / Rollo / Sister Bliss & related artists - Unofficial Discography

2001 singles
Faithless songs
Songs written by Rollo Armstrong
Songs written by Sister Bliss
Cheeky Records singles
2001 songs
Songs written by Maxi Jazz